Øvre Dåsvatn is a village in Evje og Hornnes municipality in Agder county, Norway. The picturesque lake Dåsvatn lies to the south of the village, surrounded by forest.

References

Villages in Agder
Evje og Hornnes